The men's artistic individual all-around event at the 2020 Summer Olympics was held on 24 and 28 July 2021 at the Ariake Gymnastics Centre. Approximately 70 gymnasts from 35 nations (of the 98 total gymnasts) competed in the all-around in the qualifying round.

Daiki Hashimoto of Japan became the youngest men's artistic gymnastics individual all-around champion in history at the age of 19, earning his first individual Olympic (gold) medal and second Olympic medal overall. He is also Japan's second youngest gymnast to win Olympic gold, losing the youngest title to Kenzo Shirai by only 6 days. This is the third gold in a row for Japan in the men's artistic individual all-around, after two consecutive gold medals won by Kōhei Uchimura at the last two Olympics in 2012 and 2016. This victory was Japan's seventh overall, breaking the tie Japan shared with the Soviet Union, which now have one less at six, for the most number of victories in the men's individual all-around event. Hashimoto's medal also earned the Japanese gymnastics program its 100th overall Olympic medal. Chinese gymnast Xiao Ruoteng won the silver, also his first individual Olympic medal. Nikita Nagornyy of the ROC, a two-time Olympic team medalist, took the bronze. The score difference between silver and bronze was only 0.034. Nagornyy's medal is the first for Russia on the men's artistic gymnastics individual all-around event since Alexei Nemov won gold at the 2000 Summer Olympics in Sydney.

The medals for the competition were presented by Emma Terho, Finland (IOC Member), and the medalists' bouquets were presented by Arturs Mickevics, Latvia (FIG Delegate).

Background

This was the 28th appearance of the men's individual all-around. The first individual all-around competition had been held in 1900, after the 1896 competitions featured only individual apparatus events. A men's individual all-around has been held every Games since 1900. Two-time defending champion Kōhei Uchimura of Japan did not qualify to attempt winning a third consecutive title, after which he choose to focus on the individual horizontal bar during qualifications. All three World all-around champions from this quad – Xiao Ruoteng of China (2017), and Artur Dalaloyan and Nikita Nagornyy of Russia (2018 and 2019) – qualified in the top six.

Qualification

A National Olympic Committee (NOC) could enter up to 6 qualified gymnasts—a team of 4 and up to 2 specialist individuals. A total of 98 quota places are allocated to men's artistic gymnastics.

The 12 teams that qualify will be able to send 4 gymnasts in the team competition, for a total of 48 of the 98 quota places. The top three teams at the 2018 World Artistic Gymnastics Championships (China, Russia, and Japan) and the top nine teams (excluding those already qualified) at the 2019 World Artistic Gymnastics Championships (Ukraine, Great Britain, Switzerland, the United States, Chinese Taipei, South Korea, Brazil, Spain, and Germany) earned team qualification places.

The remaining 50 quota places are awarded individually. Each gymnast can only earn one place, except that gymnasts that competed with a team that qualified are eligible to earn a second place through the 2020 All Around World Cup Series. Some of the individual events are open to gymnasts from NOCs with qualified teams, while others are not. These places are filled through various criteria based on the 2019 World Championships, the 2020 FIG Artistic Gymnastics World Cup series, continental championships, a host guarantee, and a Tripartite Commission invitation. 

Each of the 98 qualified gymnasts are eligible for the individual all-around competition, but many gymnasts do not compete in each of the apparatus events.

The COVID-19 pandemic delayed many of the events for qualifying for gymnastics. The 2018 and 2019 World Championships were completed on time, but many of the World Cup series events were delayed into 2021.

Competition format
The top 24 qualifiers in the qualification phase (limit two per NOC) advanced to the all-around final. The finalists performed an additional exercise on each apparatus. Qualification scores were then ignored, with only final round scores counting. Scoring was according to the FIG Code of Points.

Schedule
The competition was held over two days, 24 July and 28 July. The qualifying round (for all men's artistic gymnastics events) was on the first day with the all-around final on the second day.

All times are Japan Standard Time (UTC+9)

Results

Qualifying

The gymnasts who ranked in the top twenty-four qualified for the final round. In a case where more than two gymnasts from the same NOC were in the top twenty-four, the last ranked among them would not qualify to final round. The next-best ranked gymnast would qualify instead.

 Reserves
The reserves for the individual all-around event final were:
 
 
 
 

Only two gymnasts from each country may advance to the all-around final. Gymnasts who did not qualify for the final because of the quota, but had high enough scores to do so were:

Final

References

Men's artistic individual all-around
2020
Olympics
Men's events at the 2020 Summer Olympics